A life-size bronze statue of Jan Smuts by the British artist Jacob Epstein stands on the north side of Parliament Square in London, United Kingdom, between a statue of Lord Palmerston and a statue of David Lloyd George.

Description
The statue depicts him in his military uniform as a field marshal, leaning forward with his left leg advanced, as if walking forward. The statue stands on a pedestal of granite from South Africa, which bears the inscription JAN/ CHRISTIAN/ SMUTS/ 1870–1950.

History
After Winston Churchill won the 1951 general election in October 1951, he proposed erecting a statue in Parliament Square as a memorial to Smuts, who had died in September 1950. Churchill retired as prime minister in 1955, and was too ill to perform the unveiling in November 1956; it was unveiled instead by the Speaker of the House of Commons, William Morrison. The statue became a Grade II listed building in 1970.

References

External links

 Jan Christian Smuts – Parliament Square, London, UK at Waymarking
 Statue of Field Marshal Jan Smuts, National Heritage List for England Historic England
 Smuts statue, londonremembers.com
 Parliament Square Garden, london.gov.uk
 The Statues of Parliament Square, Bowl Of Chalk – London Walking Tours, 12 November 2013  
 Parliament Square statues, Bob Speel
 Smuts Statue Unveiled 1956, Pathé

Bronze sculptures in the United Kingdom
Smuts, Jan
Jan Smuts
Monuments and memorials in London
Outdoor sculptures in London
Parliament Square
Sculptures by Jacob Epstein
Smuts, Jan